An amateur is a person who pursues an activity or field of study independently from their source of income.

Amateurs or The Amateur or variation, may also refer to:

Film
 The Amateur (1981 film), a 1981 Canadian crime/thriller film
 Amateur (1994 film), a 1994 comedy crime drama film
 The Amateur (1999 film), an Argentine drama film
 The Amateurs, a 2005 comedy film
 Amateur (2018 film), a 2018 American sports drama

Other uses
 The Amateur: Barack Obama in the White House, a 2012 book by American author, tabloid writer, and gossip columnist Edward Klein
 The Amateurs (band), UK indie rock band
Amateur (book), 2018 nonfiction book by Thomas Page McBee
 The Amateur Championship, UK golf tournament

See also

 
 
 Professional amateur (disambiguation)

 Armature (disambiguation)